Frank Carlton (21 March 1936 – 19 February 2009), also known by the nickname of "Carlo", was an English professional rugby league footballer who played in the 1950s and 1960s.

Background
Frank Carlton was born in Blackbrook, St. Helens, Lancashire, England, and he died aged 72 in Whiston Hospital, Whiston, Merseyside, England.

Playing career

International honours
Frank Carlton, won a cap for England while at St. Helens in 1956 against France, and won caps for Great Britain while at St. Helens in 1958 against New Zealand, and in 1962 against New Zealand.

County Cup Final appearances
Frank Carlton played , i.e. number 5, in St. Helens' 3-10 defeat by Oldham in the 1956 Lancashire County Cup Final during the 1956–57 season at Central Park, Wigan on Saturday 20 October 1956, and played , i.e. number 5, in the 2-12 defeat by Oldham in the 1958 Lancashire County Cup Final during the 1958–59 season at Station Road, Swinton Saturday 25 October 1958.

Club career
Frank Carlton made his début  for Wigan in the 10-3 victory over Hunslet F.C. at Parkside, Hunslet on Saturday 5 November 1960, he scored his first try (2-tries) for Wigan in the 16-11 victory over Blackpool Borough at Central Park, Wigan on Saturday 19 November 1960, he scored his last try for Wigan in the 12-0 victory over Liverpool City in the Western Division Championship match at Central Park, Wigan on Saturday 28 March 1964, and he played his last match for Wigan in the 13-6 victory over Leigh at Central Park, Wigan on 26 December 1964.

Honoured at St Helens
Frank Carlton is a St Helens R.F.C. Hall of Fame Inductee.

References

External links
Profile at saints.org.uk
'Flying Frank' dies aged 72
(archived by web.archive.org) RUGBY LEAGUE FINAL video newsreel film

1936 births
2009 deaths
England national rugby league team players
English rugby league players
Great Britain national rugby league team players
Rugby league centres
Rugby league players from St Helens, Merseyside
Rugby league wingers
St Helens R.F.C. players
Wigan Warriors players